Piacenza Calcio recorded their best ever finish in the top echelon of Italian football, finishing 12th in Serie A, but just two points above the relegation zone. This was in spite of key players Pasquale Luiso (Vicenza) and Eusebio Di Francesco (Roma) leaving the club before the season began.

Squad

Goalkeepers
  Matteo Sereni
  Sergio Marcon

Defenders
  Mirko Conte
  Daniele Delli Carri
  Marco Rossi
  Cleto Polonia
  Stefano Sacchetti
  Pietro Vierchowod
  Roberto Bordin
  Daniele Cozzi
  Andrea Tagliaferri

Midfielders
  Renato Buso
  Marco Piovanelli
  Alessandro Mazzola
  Giuseppe Scienza
  Giovanni Stroppa
  Aladino Valoti
  Fabian Valtolina
  Luca Matteassi
  Paolo Tramezzani
  Gianpietro Piovani

Attackers
  Simone Inzaghi
  Davide Dionigi
  Roberto Murgita
  Massimo Rastelli
  Francesco Zerbini
  Gabriele Ballotta

Serie A

Matches

Top scorers
  Davide Dionigi 5 (2)
  Roberto Murgita 5
  Gianpietro Piovani 5 (2)
  Giuseppe Scienza 3

References

Sources
  RSSSF - Italy Championship 1997/98

Piacenza Calcio 1919 seasons
Piacenza